Jericho Creek may refer to:

United States

California
Jericho Creek (Hunting Creek), a tributary of Hunting Creek in Lake County, California.

Indiana
Jericho Creek (Jordan Creek), a tributary of Jordan Creek in Vermillion County, Indiana.
Jericho Creek (Laughery Creek), a tributary of Laughery Creek in Ripley County, Indiana.

Massachusetts
Jericho Creek (Plum Island River), a tributary of the Plum Island River in Essex County, Massachusetts.

Montana
Jericho Creek (Telegraph Creek), a tributary of Telegraph Creek in Monroe County, Montana.

Oregon

Jericho Creek (North Fork John Day River), a tributary of North Fork John Day River in Umatilla County, Oregon.

Pennsylvania
Jericho Creek (Delaware River tributary), a tributary of the Delaware River in Bucks County, Pennsylvania.

Texas
Jericho Creek (Flat Fork Creek), a tributary of Flat Fork Creek in Shelby County, Texas.

Wisconsin
Jericho Creek (Eagle Spring Lake), a tributary of Eagle Spring Lake in Waukesha County, Wisconsin.